Antonio Corell Fornet (born 27 May 1950) is a Spanish former backstroke and freestyle swimmer who competed in the 1968 Summer Olympics and in the 1972 Summer Olympics.

References

References

External links
 
 
 
 

1950 births
Living people
Spanish male backstroke swimmers
Spanish male freestyle swimmers
Olympic swimmers of Spain
Swimmers at the 1968 Summer Olympics
Swimmers at the 1972 Summer Olympics
Mediterranean Games medalists in swimming
Mediterranean Games gold medalists for Spain
Mediterranean Games silver medalists for Spain
Swimmers at the 1967 Mediterranean Games
Swimmers at the 1971 Mediterranean Games